John Lloyd may refer to:

Artists, writers, and entertainers
John J. Lloyd (1922–2014), American art director and production designer
John Lloyd (graphic designer) (born 1944), co-founder of design consultancy Lloyd Northover
John Lloyd (journalist) (born 1946), Scottish-born writer, journalist and publicist
John Lloyd (producer) (born 1951), British television producer and comedy writer
John Bedford Lloyd (born 1956), American actor
John Morgan Lloyd (1880–1960), Welsh musician and composer
John Selwyn Lloyd (born 1931), Welsh-language author

Sports
John Lloyd (Australian footballer) (1945–2022), Carlton Football Club and father of Matthew Lloyd
John Lloyd (boxer), British Olympic boxer
John Lloyd (referee) (born 1948), Welsh former football referee
John Lloyd (rugby union) (born 1943), former head coach to Wales national rugby union team
John Lloyd (tennis) (born 1954), British tennis player
John Emrys Lloyd (1905–1987), British Olympic fencer
John Henry Lloyd (1884–1964), Negro leagues baseball player "Pop" Lloyd
John Lloyd (cricketer) (1844–1910), Welsh cricketer and barrister
Eddie Lloyd (John E. Lloyd, 1902–?), English professional footballer

Government, legal, and military
John Lloyd (Australian politician) (1818–1881), New South Wales politician
John Lloyd (Australian public servant), former Australian Public Service Commissioner
John Lloyd (brigadier) (1894–1965), Australian soldier and commander 16th Brigade
John Lloyd (MP for Denbighshire) (c. 1560–1606), British Member of Parliament
John Lloyd (Canadian politician) (1908–1985), member of Canadian House of Commons for Halifax electoral district
John Lloyd (Cardiganshire) (c. 1717–1755), Welsh Member of Parliament for Ceredigion
John Lloyd (civil servant) (born 1940), formerly Clerk to the National Assembly for Wales
John Lloyd (judge) (died 1607), one of the founding fellows of Jesus College, Oxford and judge of the High Court of Admiralty
John Lloyd (political reformer) (1833–1915), Welsh-born member of the London County Council
John Lloyd (scholar) (1750–1815), Welsh scholar, Fellow of the Royal Society and Member of Parliament for Flintshire
John Horatio Lloyd (1798–1884), British Member of Parliament for Stockport
John W. Lloyd (1831–?), American Medal of Honor recipient
John Yeeden Lloyd (1795–?), member of the New Zealand Legislative Council
Sir John Lloyd, 1st Baronet (died 1664), British Member of Parliament for Carmarthenshire
Selwyn Lloyd (John Selwyn Brooke Lloyd, 1904–1978), foreign secretary of the United Kingdom

Religious figures
John Lloyd (rector of Caerwys) (1733–1793), Welsh cleric and antiquarian
John Lloyd (bishop of St David's) (1638–1687), Vice-Chancellor of Oxford University, 1682–85
John Lloyd (bishop of Swansea) (1847–1915), Welsh suffragan bishop
John Lloyd (vicar of Cilcain) (1754–c. 1807), Welsh clergyman and academic
Saint John Lloyd (died 1679), one of the Catholic Forty Martyrs of England and Wales
John Lloyd (archdeacon of Montgomery) (1879–1951), Welsh clergyman
J. P. D. Lloyd (John Plummer Derwent Lloyd, 1861–1933),  Episcopal cleric in the United States and Canada

Other people
John Augustus Lloyd (1800–1854), English engineer and surveyor
John Edward Lloyd (1861–1947), Welsh historian
John Hardress-Lloyd (1874–1952), soldier and polo player
John M. Lloyd (died 1892), Washington, D.C. policeman
John Uri Lloyd (1849–1936), American pharmacist
J. William Lloyd (1857–1940), American individualist anarchist
John Davies Knatchbull Lloyd, antiquarian researcher and public servant
John Lloyd (archaeologist), British classical archaeologist

See also
Jon Lloyd (born 1956), chief executive of UK Coal
Jon Lloyd (microbiologist), professor of geomicrobiology 
John Lloyd Cruz (born 1983), Filipino actor
John Loyd (1875–1943), American college football player and physician
Jonathan Lloyd (disambiguation)